Physaria tenella is a species of flowering plant in the family Brassicaceae known by the common names Moapa bladderpod and slender bladderpod. It is native to western North America from Utah to Sonora, where it grows mainly in desert habitat. This is an annual herb producing several hairy multibranched erect to spreading stems sometimes exceeding half a meter long. The basal leaves are up to 6.5 centimeters long and sometimes toothed, and there are smaller leaves higher on the stem. The inflorescence is a raceme of flowers at the tip of the stem. The mustardlike flower has four orange to bright yellow petals each up to a centimeter long. The fruit is a plump, hairy, rounded capsule.

External links
 Calflora Database: Physaria tenella (Little bladderpod, Moapa bladderpod)
Jepson Manual eFlora treatment of Physaria tenella
USDA Plants Profile for Lesquerella tenella (Moapa bladderpod) — aka Physaria tenella.

UC CalPhotos gallery of Lesquerella tenella (Moapa bladderpod) — aka Physaria tenella.

tenella
North American desert flora
Flora of the California desert regions
Flora of Arizona
Flora of Nevada
Flora of Oregon
Flora of Sonora
Flora of the Great Basin
Natural history of the Mojave Desert
Flora without expected TNC conservation status